White Aryan Resistance (WAR) was a white supremacist and neo-Nazi organization in the United States which was founded and formerly led by former Ku Klux Klan Grand Dragon Tom Metzger. It was based in Warsaw, Indiana, and it was also incorporated as a business. In 1993, the group expanded into Canada in what they dubbed operation Maple leaf.

It held views that they self-described as racist, as seen in the sections of its website titled "Racist Jokes" and "Racist Videos," as well as in the tagline for its newspaper The Insurgent: "the most racist newspaper on Earth." WAR used the slogan "White Revolution is the Only Solution".

History 
Metzger's first group was known as the White Brotherhood, which he led in the mid-1970s until he joined David Duke's Knights of the Ku Klux Klan in 1975. By 1979 he had risen to the rank of Grand Dragon of the California realm. During these years the California realm conducted unofficial border patrols on the Mexican border.
The realm also kept a blackshirted security detail which engaged in skirmishes with anti-Klan demonstrators and police.

In Oceanside, California, in the spring of 1980, an incident involved 30 members of this squad and left seven people injured. In the summer of 1980 Metzger left the national organization and founded his own organization, the California Knights of the Ku Klux Klan.

The White Brotherhood continued to harass Hispanics, Chinese Americans, and Vietnamese refugees.

From 1980 to late 1982, Metzger headed the California Knights, and during the same period, he also pursued electoral office. In 1982 he left the Klan to found a new group, the White American Political Association, a group which was dedicated to promoting "prowhite" candidates for public office.  After losing the 1982 California Senate Democratic primary, Metzger abandoned the electoral route and renamed WAPA White American Resistance in 1983 and then renamed it White Aryan Resistance, to reflect a more "revolutionary" stance.

By the late 1980s, Tom Metzger began broadcasting Race and Reason, a public-access cable television show, airing WAR propaganda and interviewing other neo-Nazis. The show caused much controversy, and its guests included anti-abortion speakers, Holocaust deniers and pro-segregation lawyers. WAR members gained attention through appearances on talk shows throughout the late 1980s.

In 1988 Metzger, recorded this message on his "WAR Hotline",
You have reached WAR Hotline. White Aryan Resistance. You ask: What is WAR? We are an openly white-racist movement. Skinheads, we welcome you into our ranks; the federal government is the number one enemy of our race. When was the last time you heard a politician speaking out in favor of white people? ... You say the government is too big; we can't organize. Well, by God, the SS did it in Germany, and if they did it in Germany in the thirties, we can do it right here in the streets of America. We need to cleanse this nation of all nonwhite mud-races for the survival of our own people and the generations of our children.

Murder of Mulugeta Seraw and civil prosecution of the Metzgers
On November 13, 1988, three white Aryan supremacists who were members of East Side White Pride, which allegedly had ties to WAR, beat to death Mulugeta Seraw, an Ethiopian man who had moved to the United States in order to attend college.

In October 1990, the Southern Poverty Law Center won a civil case on behalf of the deceased man's family against Tom and John Metzger and WAR, for a total of US$12.5 million. The Metzgers did not have millions of dollars, so the Seraw family only received assets from the Metzger's $125,000 house and a few thousand dollars. The Metzgers declared bankruptcy, but WAR continued to operate. WAR continued to publish a newspaper despite the verdict. Metzger launched a website in 1997 and had an Internet radio program.  The cost of trial, in the hundreds of thousands of dollars, was absorbed by the SPLC and the Anti-Defamation League, according to Morris Dees, founder of the SPLC.

Threats against video stores by a WAR member
WAR was mentioned in the press when it was revealed that one of its members threatened video stores in Rhode Island because they carried Jungle Fever. In 1994, Richard Campos, a WAR sympathizer, was convicted of racially motivated bombing plots. Calls were made in which it was stated that the bombings were perpetrated by an organization called the Aryan Liberation Front, of which Campos was the only member. In early 1995, Campos was sentenced to the maximum term of 17 years in prison.

See also
 Antisemitism in the United States
 Racism in the United States
 List of Ku Klux Klan organizations
 List of neo-Nazi organizations
 List of organizations designated by the Southern Poverty Law Center as hate groups
 List of white nationalist organizations
 Racism against Black Americans

References

Further reading
Morris Dees. Hate on Trial: The Case Against America's Most Dangerous Neo-Nazi. Villard, (February 23, 1993)  (280 pages)
Elinor Langer. A Hundred Little Hitlers: The Death of a Black Man, the Trial of a White Racist, and the Rise of the Neo-Nazi Movement in America. New York: Henry Holt, 2003.

External links
White Aryan Resistance
Articles related to WAR - from the Nizkor Project
Profile of Tom Metzger from the Anti-Defamation League
White Aryan Resistance file at the FBI

Anti-immigration politics in the United States
Neo-Nazi organizations in the United States
Anti-Chinese sentiment in the United States
Organizations established in 1983
1983 establishments in Indiana
Anti-communism in the United States
Right-wing militia organizations in the United States